Brendan McDonough (born December 27, 1996) is an American soccer player.

Career

Early life 
McDonough was born in Atlanta, Georgia, but raised in Charlotte, North Carolina. He played three years for Charlotte Catholic High School, while spending his junior year in Germany training with both FT Braunschweig and Eintracht Braunschweig.

College 
McDonough played four years of college soccer at Georgetown University between 2015 and 2018, where he made 63 appearances, scoring 2 goals, and tallying 2 assists.

Professional 
On January 11, 2019, McDonough was selected 35th overall in the 2019 MLS SuperDraft by Vancouver Whitecaps FC. He was officially added to the club's roster on March 6, 2019, signing an MLS contract for 2019 with options through to 2022.

McDonough made his professional debut on June 26, 2019, starting in a 2–2 draw with FC Dallas.

On August 7, 2019, McDonough was loaned to USL Championship side Charlotte Independence for the remainder of the season.

McDonough was released by Vancouver at the end of the 2019 season.

References

External links

Georgetown Hoyas bio

1996 births
Living people
American soccer players
American expatriate soccer players
Georgetown Hoyas men's soccer players
Vancouver Whitecaps FC players
Charlotte Independence players
Association football defenders
Soccer players from North Carolina
Expatriate soccer players in Canada
Vancouver Whitecaps FC draft picks
Major League Soccer players